Michael Edward Acland (born 4 June 1935) was an English professional footballer of the 1950s. Born in Sidcup, he began his professional career with Gillingham but quickly dropped into non-league football. He made two appearances in The Football League. He later managed Erith & Belvedere between 1996 and 2003.

References

1935 births
Living people
English footballers
Footballers from Sidcup
Gillingham F.C. players
Bromley F.C. players
Sutton United F.C. players
Dartford F.C. players
Cray Wanderers F.C. players
English football managers
Erith & Belvedere F.C. managers
Association football inside forwards